Waleed Al-Enezi (born 6 July 1996) is a Saudi Arabian professional footballer who plays as a goalkeeper for Al-Fateh.

Career
Al-Enezi began his career at the youth team of Arar. On 21 July 2014, Al-Enezi moved to youth team of Al-Nassr. On 31 January 2018, Al-Enezi signed his first professional contract, a five-year contract, with Al-Nassr. On 25 August 2019, Al-Enezi signed for Al-Nojoom on loan from Al-Nassr. On 30 August 2021, Al-Enezi joined Al-Fateh on loan. On 12 August 2022, Al-Enezi joined Al-Fateh on a free transfer following the expiration of his contract with Al-Nassr.

References

External links 
 

1996 births
Living people
People from Arar, Saudi Arabia
Saudi Arabian footballers
Arar FC players
Al Nassr FC players
Al-Nojoom FC players
Al-Fateh SC players
Saudi Professional League players
Saudi First Division League players
Association football goalkeepers